The Battle of Waidhofen took place on 14 October 1431 near the present town of Waidhofen an der Thaya in Austria. The Taborites led by Mikuláš Sokol of Lamberka were returning from a marauding ride when they were defeated by Imperial Austrian forces.

References
 Cornejo, Peter. Great history of the Czech lands V. 1402–1437. Prague: Paseka, 2000. 790 pp. .
 Cornejo, Peter. Lipanská crossroads: causes, course and historical significance in one battle. Praha: Panorama, 1992. 277 pp. .
 Frankenberger, Otakar. Our great army - Part III. Praha: Agricultural bookstore, 1921. 188 pp.
 Palacký, Francis. History of the Czech Nation in Bohemia and Moravia. Prague: B. Koci, 1907. 1279 s.
 Šmahel, Francis. Hussite revolution. 3rd chronicle of the war years. Praha: Karolinum, 1996. 420 pp. .
 Toman, Hugo. Hussite warfare at the time Zizka and Prokop. Prague: Czech Royal Society of Sciences, 1898. 468 pp.

1431 in Europe
Waidhofen 1431
Waidhofen 1431
Waidhofen 1431
Conflicts in 1431
History of Lower Austria